Comparative Biochemistry and Physiology is a series of three journals published by Elsevier with coverage of three aspects of biochemistry and physiology.

These are:
 Comparative Biochemistry and Physiology A, covering Molecular & Integrative Physiology
 Comparative Biochemistry and Physiology B, covering Biochemistry and Molecular Biology
 Comparative Biochemistry and Physiology C, covering Toxicology and Pharmacology

External links
Comparative Biochemistry and Physiology - Part A: Molecular & Integrative Physiology webpage
Comparative Biochemistry and Physiology - Part B: Biochemistry & Molecular Biology webpage
Comparative Biochemistry and Physiology - Part C: Toxicology & Pharmacology webpage